Hidajet "Hido" Biščević (born 18 September 1951, in Sarajevo) is a Croatian diplomat, former Secretary General of the Regional Cooperation Council. He is currently working as Croatia's ambassador to Serbia.

Of Bosniak descent, he is also a journalist, having been editor-in-chief of the Vjesnik daily from 1990–92, and their foreign affairs editor from 1985–89, as well as an author of several books on international relations, concerning the breakup of Yugoslavia, the Iranian Revolution and the Iran–Iraq War.

Biščević graduated from the Faculty of Political Sciences at the University of Zagreb. After working at the state-owned Vjesnik daily newspaper in the 1980s and early 1990s, Biščević joined the Croatian diplomatic service in 1992, and was initially named Head of Department for Asian and Arab Countries at the Croatian Ministry of Foreign Affairs and Adviser to the Foreign Minister.

From 1993–95, he was Croatia's ambassador to Turkey, after which he was appointed as Assistant Minister for Foreign Affairs (1995–97), before serving as ambassador to Russia (1997–2002). Upon returning from Moscow, he served as the State Secretary for Political Affairs at the Ministry of Foreign Affairs from 2003–07. 

On 10 May 2007, at the Southeast European Cooperation Process (SEECP) Foreign Ministers summit in Zagreb, he was appointed the first Secretary General of the newly established Regional Cooperation Council (RCC), and his term officially began on 1 January 2008.

Selected works
 EU for YOU - Functioning of the EU (Croatian Edition 2006, with Wolfgang Böhm and Otmar Lahodynsky)
 Strategija kaosa,  (1989)
 U ime Alaha,  (1987)
 Krv na vodi,  (1987)

External links
Biography at the Regional Cooperation Council official website
Biography at the Croatian Ministry of Foreign Affairs official website 

1951 births
Living people
Croatian diplomats
Ambassadors of Croatia to Russia
Ambassadors of Croatia to Turkey
Journalists from Sarajevo
Bosniaks of Croatia
Faculty of Political Sciences, University of Zagreb alumni
Ambassadors of Croatia to Serbia
Vjesnik editors